Mike Piersante is a recording engineer and mixer.

2009 Grammy Awards 
Mike Piersante won two Grammy Awards in 2009 for his work as Engineer/Mixer. The first Grammy was for "Please Read the Letter" a duet track by Alison Krauss and Robert Plant. Krauss and Plant sang this track as a duet which was released on the album Raising Sand, available on Rounder which won another 2009 Grammy for Mike Piersante for Album of the Year.

References

External links
 
 

Year of birth missing (living people)
Living people
Grammy Award winners
Place of birth missing (living people)
Audio production engineers